Lutz Philipp (14 October 1940 – 1 February 2012) was a German long-distance runner. He competed at the 1964, 1968 and 1972 Summer Olympics.

References

External links
 

1940 births
2012 deaths
Athletes (track and field) at the 1964 Summer Olympics
Athletes (track and field) at the 1968 Summer Olympics
Athletes (track and field) at the 1972 Summer Olympics
Olympic athletes of the United Team of Germany
Olympic athletes of West Germany
Sportspeople from Königsberg
West German male long-distance runners
Universiade medalists in athletics (track and field)
Universiade silver medalists for West Germany
Medalists at the 1965 Summer Universiade
Medalists at the 1967 Summer Universiade